Patrick Lung (8 February 1934 – 2 September 2014), also known as Lung Kong, Patrick Lung Kong, was a film director from Hong Kong. Before working at the film industry, he worked at the stock market. In the late 1950s, he was invited to join Shaw Brothers Studio to learn filmmaking and become a film director. In 1970s, he was awarded "Best Director" award at the 19th Asia-Pacific Film Festival for directing The Call Girls.

Filmography

Films 
This is a partial list of films.
 1959 Young Rock - Au Kim Wah
 1966 Prince of Broadcasters - Writer, director
 1967 The Story of a Discharged Prisoner - Inspector Lui. Also as writer, director. 
 1967 Man from Interpol 
 1968 The Window - Director.
 1969 Teddy Girls - Lai Shing. Director, screenwriter. 
 1970 Yesterday, Today, Tomorrow - Director, screenwriter, actor. 
 1971 My Beloved - Director.
 1972 Pei Shih - Director.
 1973 The Call Girls - Director.
 1974 Hiroshima 28 - Lee Ko-Chiang. Director, screenwriter.
 1976 Laugh In - Director.
 1976 Nina - Director.
 1977 Mitra - Director.
 1979 The Fairy, the Ghost and Ah Chung - Director.

Awards 
 2014 Lifetime Achievement Award. Presented at New York Asian Film Festival. August 15, 2014.

References

External links 
 
 
 
 Patrick Lung at filmaffinity.com

 Lung Kong at bfi.org.uk
 Nick Pinkerton on “Yesterday, Today, Tomorrow: The Cinema of Patrick Lung Kong” (August 12, 2014)

Hong Kong emigrants to the United States
Hong Kong Buddhists
Hong Kong film directors
American people of Chinese descent
1934 births
2014 deaths
Hong Kong film actors
Hong Kong screenwriters
Hong Kong producers